The Nacional is a rare variety of cocoa bean found in areas of South America such as Ecuador and Peru. Some experts in the 21st century had formerly considered the Nacional bean to be extinct. Pure genotypes of the bean are rare because most Nacional varieties have been interbred with other cocoa bean varieties. The Ecuadorian cacao variety called “Nacional” traces its genetic lineage as far back as 3,500 years, to the earliest-known cacao trees domesticated by humanity. In the 18th and 19th centuries Nacional was considered by many European chocolatiers to be the most coveted source of cacao in the world because of its floral aroma and complex flavor profile. This was the golden era of Ecuadorian cacao, but it came to an abrupt end in 1916, when an outbreak of “Witches’ Broom” disease devastated the Nacional variety throughout the country. After the disease hit, germplasm from foreign cacao varieties was subsequently introduced into the country starting in the 1930s, which resulted in the widespread hybridization of Ecuadorian cacao. By the beginning of the 21st century most people believed that the pure Nacional genotype no longer existed.

In 2009, Ecuador’s agricultural research institute (INIAP) collected DNA samples from cacao trees throughout Ecuador, only 6 trees (out of 11,000 samples tested) were confirmed to be 100% genetically pure Nacional cacao. That is only 0.05% of the cacao trees that INIAP analyzed in their field research. In 2013 groves of 100-120 year old cocoa trees were discovered by To'ak Chocolate in the valley of Piedra de Plata located in the mountains of the Arriba cacao-growing region of Ecuador in the province of Manabi. With the help of the Heirloom Cacao Preservation fund (HCP), along with Freddy Amores, the director of INIAP, and Dr. Lyndel Meinhardt with the USDA-ARS, To'ak ran DNA tests on a small sample size of these trees. Of the sixteen old arbor trees tested, nine of them proved to be genetically pure Nacional variety. DNA analysis confirmed that the beans were comprised purely of the Nacional genotype bringing the number of DNA-verified pure Nacional trees in Ecuador to a grand total of fifteen.

References

Further reading
 
 Loor Solórzano R.G., Risterucci A.M., Courtois B., Fouet O., Jeanneau M., et al. (2009) Tracing the native ancestors of modern Theobroma cacao L. population in Ecuador. Tree genetics and genomes.
 Preuss P. (1901) Expedition nach Central- und Sudamerika 1899/1900. Kolonial-Wirtschaftlichen Komitees, Berlin.

Chocolate
Edible nuts and seeds
Crops originating from South America
Food plant cultivars